Gamlakarleby Segelförening (abbreviation GSF) is a yacht club in Kokkola, Finland.

GSF was established on 27 February 1872, becoming Finland's 4th oldest yacht club after BSF in Pori (1856), NJK in Helsinki (1861) and ASS in Turku.

The club hosted the 1975 Snipe World Junior Championship, which was won by GSF's sailors Heikki Haimakainen and Timo Karlsson, and the 1992 European Championship.

References

External links 
Official website

Yacht clubs in Finland
Sports clubs established in 1872
Kokkola